The 2012 Major League Soccer season was the 100th season of FIFA-sanctioned soccer in the United States and Canada, the 34th with a national first-division league, and the 17th season of Major League Soccer.

The regular season began on March 10, when the Vancouver Whitecaps FC defeated the expansion team Montreal Impact 2–0 at BC Place, and concluded with the host Los Angeles Galaxy defeating the Seattle Sounders FC 1–0 on October 28 at The Home Depot Center.  The season also featured the 2012 MLS All-Star Game on July 28, when MLS All-Stars defeated the Chelsea 3–2 at PPL Park (hosted by the Philadelphia Union).  The San Jose Earthquakes would go on to become the Supporters' Shield champions by earning the most points of any team throughout the regular season.  The 2012 MLS Cup Playoffs ran from October 31 until December 1, when the Los Angeles Galaxy claimed their fourth MLS Cup title by defeating Houston Dynamo 3–1 in MLS Cup 2012 at Home Depot Center in Carson, CA.

Changes from 2011
The 2012 MLS season features several significant on- and off-field changes from 2011:
 The Montreal Impact became the 19th MLS franchise, replacing a same-named Montreal club that previously played in the North American Soccer League in 2011 and in the USL First Division before that.  The Impact made their on-field debut on March 10 in a 2–0 loss at Vancouver.  The Impact's home debut, a 1–1 draw with the Chicago Fire on March 17, attracted 58,912 to Olympic Stadium, setting the all-time record crowd for professional soccer in Montreal.  A 1–1 draw with the Los Angeles Galaxy on May 12 attracted 60,860, setting the all-time attendance record for professional soccer in Canada.
The Impact joined MLS as the 10th team in the Eastern Conference; the Western Conference remains at 9 teams.
Each of the 19 teams plays a 34-game regular season schedule, one that employs a new unbalanced format that gives greater emphasis on in-conference matchups.
Western Conference clubs will play each conference rival three times, and play once against each Eastern Conference club.
Eastern Conference clubs will play seven of their conference rivals three times, the remaining two conference rivals twice, and each Western Conference club once.
The span of the regular season will be the longest in MLS history, beginning with 5 matches on March 10 and ending with 3 matches on October 28.
A change to the Designated Player Rule regarding international players took effect with the start of the 2012 season.  The salary cap charge for international designated players (i.e., players not from the U.S. or Canada) will depend on the players' ages:
 age 20 and younger: $150,000
 ages 21 to 23: $200,000
 over 23 years of age: $350,000
The league gained a new U.S. TV partner in NBC Sports, whose 3-year deal was announced in August 2011 (replacing expired deals with Fox Soccer and Fox Deportes) and began on March 11 with an NBC Sports Network broadcast of the New York Red Bulls/FC Dallas match.  As part of the deal, NBC Sports Network will air 38 regular season and 3 playoff matches, while the main NBC network will air 3 regular season and 2 playoff matches (the first time since 2002 that that many MLS games will be broadcast on English-language network television).  NBC and NBCSN will also air United States men's national soccer team matches (2 on each network).  Previous deals with U.S. partners ESPN, ESPN2, ESPN Deportes, and Galavisión continue in 2012, as do deals with Canadian partners TSN, TSN2, and GolTV.
The MLS Cup Playoffs setup will undergo several changes, as will the Championship Game, which will be played on its latest date ever, December 1. (see MLS Cup below)

Teams, stadiums, and personnel

Stadiums and locations

Personnel and sponsorship
Five MLS teams saw changes in jersey sponsorship for the 2012 season:
Bank of Montreal became the first shirt sponsor for the Montreal Impact.
The Chicago Fire, who went without a jersey sponsor in 2011, gained one in Quaker Oats Company.
The Columbus Crew, who also did not have a 2011 jersey sponsor, gained sponsorship from Barbasol.
Amway Global declined to renew its sponsorship of the San Jose Earthquakes, which has yet to find a replacement.
On June 27, it was announced that AdvoCare had reached an agreement with FC Dallas to become the first shirt sponsor in club history.

Note: All teams use Adidas as kit manufacturer.

Player transfers

Major League Soccer employs no fewer than 12 methods to acquire players. These include: signing players on transfers/free transfers as is done in most of the world; via trades; drafting players through mechanisms such as the MLS SuperDraft, MLS Supplemental Draft, or MLS Re-Entry Draft; rarely used methods which cover extreme hardship and injury replacement; signing players as Designated Players or Homegrown Players; placing a discovery claim on players; waivers; and methods peculiar to MLS such as through allocation or a weighted lottery.

Allocation ranking
The allocation ranking is the mechanism used to determine which MLS club has first priority to acquire a U.S. National Team player who signs with MLS after playing abroad, or a former MLS player who returns to the League after having gone to a club abroad for a transfer fee. The allocation rankings may also be used in the event two or more clubs file a request for the same player on the same day. The allocations will be ranked in reverse order of finish for the 2011 season, taking playoff performance into account.

Once the club uses its allocation ranking to acquire a player, it drops to the bottom of the list. A ranking can be traded, provided that part of the compensation received in return is another club's ranking. At all times, each club is assigned one ranking. The rankings reset at the end of each MLS League season.

 Montreal immediately traded Johnson to Seattle in exchange for Mike Fucito and Lamar Neagle.

Vancouver originally had the No. 2 ranking, but traded it to Philadelphia on June 26.

∞Toronto originally had the No. 4 ranking, but traded it to Seattle on September 14.

The remaining order after FC Dallas is: Vancouver Whitecaps FC (from Philadelphia), Toronto FC (from Seattle), Sporting Kansas City, Real Salt Lake, Houston Dynamo and Los Angeles Galaxy. In the unlikely event that all clubs use an allocation, the order begins anew with Montreal Impact, Colorado Rapids, Philadelphia Union, New York Red Bulls New England Revolution and Seattle Sounders FC.

Weighted lottery
Some players are assigned to MLS teams via a weighted lottery process. A team can only acquire one player per year through a weighted lottery. The players made available through lotteries include: (i) Generation adidas players signed after the MLS SuperDraft; and (ii) Draft eligible players to whom an MLS contract was offered but who failed to sign with the League prior to the SuperDraft.

The team with the worst record over its last 30 regular season games (dating back to previous season if necessary and taking playoff performance into account) will have the greatest probability of winning the lottery. Teams are not required to participate in a lottery. Players are assigned via the lottery system in order to prevent a player from potentially influencing his destination club with a strategic holdout.

The results of 2012 weighted lotteries thus far:

Ownership changes

Regular season standings

Conferences

Eastern Conference

Western Conference

Overall table
Note: the table below has no impact on playoff qualification and is used solely for determining host of the MLS Cup, certain CCL spots, seeding in the 2013 Canadian Championship, and 2013 MLS draft. The conference tables are the sole determinant for teams qualifying for the playoffs.

Tiebreak rules
When two or more teams are tied in standings on points the following tiebreak rules apply:

 Goals for
 Goal differential 
 Fewest disciplinary points in the official points table  (foul - 1 pt, first yellow - 3 pts, second yellow - 5 pts, straight red - 6 pts, disciplinary commission suspension - 6 pts, etc.)
 Road goals
 Road goal differential
 Coin toss (2 teams) or drawing of lots (3 or more teams)

Playoff bracket

Statistical leaders
Full article: MLS Golden Boot

Top scorers

Source:

Top assists

Source:

|}

Top goalkeepers
(Minimum of 1,500 minutes played)

Source:

Individual awards

Monthly awards

Weekly awards

Scoring
First goal of the season: Sébastien Le Toux for Vancouver Whitecaps FC against Montreal Impact, 3 minutes 1 second (March 10, 2012)
Hat-tricks of the season:
David Estrada for Seattle Sounders FC against Toronto FC (March 17, 2012)
Thierry Henry for New York Red Bulls against Montreal Impact (March 31, 2012)
Chris Pontius for D.C. United against New York Red Bulls (April 22, 2012)
Álvaro Saborío for Real Salt Lake against Portland Timbers (July 7, 2012)
Chris Wondolowski for San Jose Earthquakes against Real Salt Lake (July 14, 2012)
Fredy Montero for Seattle Sounders FC against Chivas USA (August 25, 2012)
Álvaro Saborío for Real Salt Lake against Chivas USA (September 29, 2012)
Chris Wondolowski for San Jose Earthquakes against Colorado Rapids (October 6, 2012)
Fastest hat-trick of the season:
Álvaro Saborío for Real Salt Lake against Portland Timbers, 16 minutes and 8 seconds (July 7, 2012)

Discipline
First yellow card of the season: Milovan Mirošević for Columbus Crew against Colorado Rapids, 40 minutes (March 10, 2012)
First red card of the season: Stephen McCarthy for New England Revolution against Sporting Kansas City, 14 minutes (March 17, 2012)

Related competitions

International competitions and friendlies

CONCACAF Champions League

Prior to the start of the MLS regular season, Toronto FC defeated Los Angeles Galaxy while Mexican side Santos Laguna defeated Seattle Sounders FC in two of the 2011–12 CONCACAF Champions League quarterfinal series. Toronto FC then lost 3–7 on aggregate in the semifinal with Santos Laguna.

In the 2012–13 CCL, Los Angeles Galaxy, Seattle Sounders, Houston Dynamo and Real Salt Lake earned group stage spots (the preliminary round has been eliminated). The Canadian representative, determined by the 2012 Canadian Championship, was Toronto FC.

At the end of the groups stages, the Los Angeles Galaxy, Seattle Sounders, and Houston Dynamo qualified for the quarterfinals, which will be played in March 2013.

MLS All-Star Game

The 2012 MLS All-Star Game was played on July 25 at PPL Park in Chester, Pennsylvania, home stadium of the Philadelphia Union. As has been the format every year since 2005, the MLS All-Stars played an international club; the 2012 opponent was England's Chelsea FC, 2012 champions of both the FA Cup and UEFA Champions League and visiting side in the 2006 MLS All-Star Game (when they lost to the All-Stars, 1–0, at Toyota Park in Bridgeview, Illinois). The MLS All-Stars won the game 3–2.

Domestic competitions

Lamar Hunt U.S. Open Cup

For the 2012 Lamar Hunt U.S. Open Cup tournament, U.S. Soccer has increased the size of the main tournament from 40 to 64 clubs, assembling the competition so that all U.S.-based Major League Soccer clubs gain entry. On August 8, 2012, Sporting Kansas City defeated the Seattle Sounders on penalties to win the franchise's second open cup title.

Canadian Championship

The three Canadian-based MLS clubs, Toronto FC, Montreal Impact and Vancouver Whitecaps FC, along with NASL club FC Edmonton, competed for the Voyageurs Cup, Canada's national championship trophy. The tournament is organized in a knockout format with two-legged ties in both the semifinals and final, with the away goals rule in place. Toronto defeated Vancouver in the finals, their fourth consecutive national championship, and qualified for the 2012–13 CONCACAF Champions League.

League Competitions

MLS Cup

The MLS Cup playoffs took place after the conclusion of the regular season.  For 2012, the playoff structure underwent several changes:
The playoffs will no longer feature wild cards and the possibility of "crossovers" (i.e. teams from opposite conferences playing in the early rounds).  Instead, the top five clubs in each conference's standings will qualify for the playoffs and will play in the following manner:
The 4th place team will host the 5th place team in a single "play-in" match, with the winner advancing to the conference semifinals.
The Conference Semifinals will again be a two-game aggregate goal setup as before (with extra time and penalty kicks employed if the aggregate is level after 180 minutes).  The 1st place team will play the winner of the 4th/5th game, while the 2nd and 3rd place teams play each other.  The lower-seeded team will host the first leg of each semifinal.
The semifinal winners will play each other in the Conference Finals, which will be altered to a two-game aggregate series patterned after the semifinal round (before this year, this round was a single-game format).
The Conference Final winners will advance to the MLS Cup Championship Game, which for the first time will be played at the home stadium of the finalist with the better regular season point total; before this season, the game was played at a predetermined site.

Coaches

Eastern Conference
Chicago Fire: Frank Klopas
Columbus Crew: Robert Warzycha
D.C. United: Ben Olsen
Houston Dynamo: Dominic Kinnear
Montreal Impact: Jesse Marsch
New England Revolution: Jay Heaps
New York Red Bulls: Hans Backe
Philadelphia Union: Peter Nowak and John Hackworth
Sporting Kansas City: Peter Vermes
Toronto FC: Paul Mariner

Western Conference
Chivas USA: Robin Fraser
Colorado Rapids: Óscar Pareja
FC Dallas: Schellas Hyndman
Los Angeles Galaxy: Bruce Arena
Portland Timbers: John Spencer and Gavin Wilkinson
Real Salt Lake: Jason Kreis
San Jose Earthquakes: Frank Yallop
Seattle Sounders FC: Sigi Schmid
Vancouver Whitecaps FC: Martin Rennie

Notes

References

 
2012
1